The California Independent System Operator (CAISO) is a non-profit Independent System Operator (ISO) serving California.  It oversees the operation of California's bulk electric power system, transmission lines, and electricity market generated and transmitted by its member utilities. The CAISO is one of the largest ISOs in the world, delivering 300 million megawatt-hours of electricity each year and managing about 80% of California's electric flow.

History 
The California Legislature created the CAISO in 1998 as part of the state restructuring of electricity markets.  The legislature was responding to Federal Energy Regulatory Commission (FERC) recommendations following the passage of the federal Energy Policy Act of 1992, which removed barriers to competition in the wholesale generation of electricity business. FERC regulates CAISO because interstate transmission lines fall under the jurisdiction of federal commerce laws.

Management 
CAISO's leadership consists of executive management and a governing board members appointed by the Governor of California.

The current executive leaders are:
 President and CEO: Stephen Berberich 
 Vice Presidents: Roger Collanton, Stacey Crowley, Neil Millar, Petar Ristanovic, Mark Rothleder, Ryan Seghesio, Eric Schmitt, and Jodi Ziemathis.

Renewables 

In 2018, California ranked first in the nation as a producer of electricity from solar, geothermal, and biomass resources and fourth in the nation in conventional hydroelectric power generation. As of 2017, over half of the electricity (52.7%) produced was from renewable sources. CAISO provides a daily report on California renewable electricity generation, compared to overall system demand.

Settlement for blackout 

California Independent System Operator settled with the Federal Energy Regulatory Commission and the North American Electric Reliability Corporation for $6 million for violations of standards related to the 2011 Southwest blackout.

2020 rolling blackouts 
Starting August 5 2020, CAISO ordered the utilities operating on its power grid to cut off power to 200,000 - 250,000 customers. While CAISO stated the high temperatures and corresponding high demand for air conditioning necessitated rolling blackouts, it enacted the blackouts with significant power reserves still being available. When causing the rolling blackouts, CAISO acted contrary to its own policy, with its 2019 resource assessment  calling for stage 3 emergency only with 3% or less available power resources. When stage 3 was first enacted on 8/15, the CAISO power grid had 8.9% available resources, about three times the required threshold.

See also

Energy in California
Energy law
Independent system operator
List of United States electric companies
Deregulation of the Texas electricity market
Energy Policy Act of 1992

References

External links
 Official website
 Western Energy Imbalance Market managed by CAISO video

Energy in California
Electric power transmission system operators in the United States
Companies based in California